Robert Douglas Franks (September 21, 1951 – April 9, 2010) was an American Republican politician who served as a U.S. Representative from New Jersey.

Early life
Franks was born on September 21, 1951, in Hackensack, New Jersey, the son of Norman A. Franks (1921–2000) and June E. Franks.  He grew up in Glen Rock, New Jersey before his family moved to suburban Chicago.  They returned to New Jersey, where Franks attended Summit High School. He graduated from DePauw University in 1973 where he was President of the Student Senate, 
and from the Dedman School of Law at Southern Methodist University in 1976.

Early Political Activities
He had been involved in Republican politics while growing up, including the races of Senator Charles H. Percy. As a teenager, he returned to his home state. While in Summit, he became involved with the Young Republicans and the Kean for Assembly races. Franks helped to found the Union County Young Republicans Franks then served as an aide, consultant and campaign manager to several congressman including Jim Courter and Dean Gallo as well as Governor Thomas Kean. The primary profession of Franks, however, was that of a newspaper publisher.

New Jersey State Assemblyman
In 1979, Franks was a candidate for Union County Freeholder when State Senator Peter J. McDonough resigned.  Assemblyman Donald DiFrancesco ran for the Senate, and Franks switched to the Assembly race.  He defeated Marie Kissebeth, the Berkeley Heights mayor, at the Republican convention.

When he was redistricted into the 22nd Legislative District, a Union/Essex district in 1981 and Essex Republicans demanded an Assembly seat, Franks survived and the Union Republicans dumped another incumbent, William J. Maguire.  He was re-elected in 1981, 1983, 1985, 1987, 1989 and 1991.

While in the Assembly, he also served two terms as chairman of the New Jersey Republican State Committee, 1987–89 and 1990–92. In the second term, finding widespread voter discontent with Governor Jim Florio's tax hikes, he led the Republican Party to winning veto-proof majorities in both houses of the Legislature.

He was succeeded in the Assembly by Alan Augustine.

U.S. Congressman
In 1992, Franks was elected to the U. S. House of Representatives (succeeding Matt Rinaldo), and served four terms in the House from 1993 to 2001. While he was a congressman, he was a member of the Transportation Committee and involved with transportation issues. He was known as a budget "hawk" and was a strong supporter of the Contract with America, including voluntary terms limits.

Franks was the New Jersey campaign chairman for U.S. Rep. Jack Kemp in the campaign for the 1988 Republican presidential nomination. He endorsed New Jersey publisher Steve Forbes in 1996, and U.S. Rep. John Kasich in 2000.  Franks and Kasich served together on the House Budget Committee and became close friends.  Kasich is the godfather of Franks' eldest daughter, Kelly, and was one of the eulogizers at Franks' 2010 funeral.

2000 U.S. Senate campaign

In 2000, Franks gave up his House seat (true to his "term limits" vow) to become the Republican candidate to the open Senate seat from New Jersey. However, he was defeated by Democrat Jon Corzine.

In this race Franks was far outspent by Corzine, a former CEO, by 48 million dollars, yet still was the closest the Republicans have come to winning a New Jersey United States Senate seat since Clifford Case won a fourth term re-election in 1972. Corzine defeated Franks by less than 100,000 votes and a vote percentage of 51.1% to 47.1% in the 2000 US Senate election.

2001 gubernatorial campaign

He was defeated for the Republican nomination for New Jersey governor in 2001 by Bret Schundler, who ran on a more conservative platform. Franks entered the 2001 governor's race reluctantly, following the withdrawal of former Governor Donald DiFrancesco, after having previous announced that he would not be a candidate. It is believed this late start cost him the primary as Schundler had a big head start in campaigning and fundraising.

Jack Abramoff helped Schundler raise funds against Franks because of his refusal to hold off a "Made in the USA" bill that harmed Abramoff's clients in the Northern Marianas Islands despite assurances he wouldn't introduce the bill until further discussions occurred. The bill was introduced the next day without further discussions. Abramoff retaliated "He was running for governor. I raised a bunch of money for his opponent in the primary and made sure everyone knew I was doing it. He lost his primary. No other Republican tried to slap the CNMI while I was a lobbyist." Abramoff said in an interview.

Franks remained involved in New Jersey politics and was often mentioned as a potential candidate for high offices, but Franks discouraged such speculation. Many thought that his next public office, if any, would have been appointive.

Franks served as President of the Health Care Institute of New Jersey. There was speculation he might run again for Congress when his successor, Mike Ferguson, announced in 2007 that he would not seek reelection in 2008.  However, Franks then declined to run, saying "Representing the people of Central New Jersey in the House of Representatives from 1993 to 2001 was one of the important and rewarding experiences of my life; however I find my work at the HealthCare Institute of New Jersey very fulfilling and I'm enjoying nights and weekends with my family...  I have no desire to run for Congress next year."

Death and legacy
A resident of Warren Township, Franks died of cancer at Memorial Sloan Kettering Hospital in New York City on April 9, 2010.

On September 24, 2013, at the dedication of a rail station in Union, New Jersey in honor of Franks, Gov. Chris Christie revealed that he had offered Franks the Republican nomination for Lt. Governor on his ticket in 2009, but that he was turned down. Christie then went to his second choice, Kim Guadagno.

Electoral history
{| class="wikitable" style="margin:0.5em ; font-size:95%"
|+ : Results 1992–1998
!|Year
!
!|Democrat
!|Votes
!|Pct
!
!|Republican
!|Votes
!|Pct
!
!|3rd Party
!|Party
!|Votes
!|Pct
!
!|3rd Party
!|Party
!|Votes
!|Pct
!
!|3rd Party
!|Party
!|Votes
!|Pct
!
|-
|1992
|
| |
| align="right" |105,761
| |43%
|
| |
| align="right" |132,174
| |53%
|
| | Gillespie
| |Independent
| align="right" |4,043
| align="right" |2%
|
| |Bill Campbell
| | Government
| align="right" |2,612
| align="right" |1%
|
| |Spencer Layman
| |Libertarian
| align="right" |1,964
| align="right" |1%
| |*
|-
|1994
|
| |Karen Carroll
| align="right" |64,231
| |39%
|
| |Bob Franks
| align="right" |98,814
| |60%
|
| | Cleary
| |LaRouche Was Right
| align="right" |2,331
| align="right" |1%
| |*
|
|
|
|
|
|
|
|
|
|
|-
|1996
|
| |Larry Lerner
| align="right" |97,285
| |42%
|
| |Bob Franks
| align="right" |128,821
| |55%
|
| |Dorothy DeLaura
| |Independent
| align="right" |4,076
| align="right" |2%
|
| |Nicholas Gentile
| |Independent
| align="right" |1,693
| align="right" |1%
|
| |Robert G. Robertson
| |Independent
| align="right" |696
| align="right" |<1%
|
|-
|1998
|
| |
| align="right" |65,776
| |44%
|
| |Bob Franks
| align="right" |77,751
| |53%
|
| |Richard C. Martin
| |Independent
| align="right" |3,007
| align="right" |2%
|
| |Darren Young
| |Independent
| align="right" |1,508
| align="right" |1%
|
|
|
|
|
|Write-in and minor candidate notes:  In 1992, John L. Kucek running as an America First Populist received 844 votes and Kevin Michael Criss running under People's Congressional Preference received 684 votes.  In 1994, Claire Greene received 481 votes.

{| class="wikitable" style="margin:0.5em ; font-size:95%"
|+2000 U.S. Senate Race – Republican Primary
!|Candidate
!|Pct
!
!|Candidate
!|Pct
!
!|Candidate
!|Pct
|-
|
|36%
|
|William Gormley
|34%
|
|Others
|30%
|

References

External links

 

|-

|-

|-

|-

1951 births
2010 deaths
Republican Party members of the New Jersey General Assembly
DePauw University alumni
Dedman School of Law alumni
People from Glen Rock, New Jersey
Politicians from Hackensack, New Jersey
Politicians from Summit, New Jersey
People from Warren Township, New Jersey
Politicians from Chicago
Politicians from Union County, New Jersey
Chairmen of the New Jersey Republican State Committee
Deaths from cancer in New York (state)
Republican Party members of the United States House of Representatives from New Jersey
Summit High School (New Jersey) alumni
20th-century American politicians
Candidates in the 2000 United States elections
Candidates in the 2001 United States elections